Dave Van Ronk Sings Ballads, Blues and a Spiritual is an album by American folksinger Dave Van Ronk, released in May 1959 on Folkways Records.

It was also released on LP as Gambler's Blues and as Black Mountain Blues. Some of the songs can be found on the 1991 Smithsonian Folkways CD release The Folkways Years, 1959–1961.

Track listing

Side one
"Duncan and Brady" – 3:00
"Black Mountain Blues" – 4:00
"In the Pines" – 3:04
"My Baby's So Sweet" – 2:32
"Twelve Gates to the City" – 3:12
"Winin' Boy Blues" – 2:35
"If You Leave Me Pretty Mama"

Side two
"Backwater Blues"
"Careless Love" (W.C. Handy, Martha E. Koenig, Spencer Williams) – 3:56
"Betty And Dupree"
"K. C. Moan"
"Gambler's Blues"
"John Henry"
"How Long"

Personnel
Dave Van Ronk - guitar, vocals
David Gahr - photography
Ronald Clyne - cover design

References

1959 debut albums
Dave Van Ronk albums
Verve Records albums
Folkways Records albums